Funa cretea is a species of sea snail, a marine gastropod mollusk in the family Pseudomelatomidae, the turrids and allies.

Description

Distribution
This marine species occurs in the China seas.

References

 Li B.Q., Kilburn R.N., & Li X.Z. (2010). Report on Crassispirinae Morrison, (Mollusca: Neogastropoda: Turridae) from the China Seas. Journal of Natural History. 44, 699-740

cretea
Gastropods described in 2010